Eric Andrew Gunderson (born March 29, 1966) is a former Major League Baseball pitcher who played in the major leagues from – and –. He attended college at Portland State University.

References

External links

1966 births
Living people
American expatriate baseball players in Canada
Baseball players from Oregon
Binghamton Mets players
Boston Red Sox players
Buffalo Bisons (minor league) players
Calgary Cannons players
Columbus Clippers players
Everett Giants players
Fresno Grizzlies players
Jacksonville Suns players
Major League Baseball pitchers
New York Mets players
Norfolk Tides players
Oklahoma RedHawks players
Pawtucket Red Sox players
Phoenix Firebirds players
Portland State Vikings baseball players
San Francisco Giants players
San Jose Giants players
Seattle Mariners players
Shreveport Captains players
St. Lucie Mets players
Syracuse SkyChiefs players
Texas Rangers players
Toronto Blue Jays players